Karen Pang is an Australian film and TV actress and presenter of Chinese descent.

Biography

Pang graduated from the National Institute of Dramatic Art (NIDA), with a degree in Performing Arts (Acting) in 1990

She has been best known for being a presenter on children's program Play School, having been a presenter of the program since 1998, and she has also had roles in movies including Superman Returns, Safety in Numbers (2006 film), Danny Deckchair, The Nugget and Low Fat Elephants.  She has also had several roles on mini-series and television, including Home and Away'' and All Saints. She is married to Bruce Chan.

External links

Australian film actresses
Australian television actresses
Living people
National Institute of Dramatic Art alumni
Australian people of Chinese descent
Australian children's television presenters
Year of birth missing (living people)
Australian women television presenters
Australian actresses of Asian descent